Meiling is a town under the administration of Zhao'an County, Fujian, China. , it has 15 villages under its administration.

References 

Township-level divisions of Fujian
Zhao'an County